Kongshaug is a surname. Notable people with the surname include:

Erling Kongshaug (1915–1993), Norwegian rifle shooter
Jan Erik Kongshaug (1944–2019), Norwegian sound engineer, jazz guitarist, and composer
Leif Helge Kongshaug (born 1949), Norwegian politician
Peder Kongshaug (born 2001), Norwegian speed skater

Norwegian-language surnames